Picture Perfect Golf is a 1994 video game from Empire Interactive.

Reception

Bill Goodykoontz from Arizona Republic said in his review that "The Commentary is adequate, however, the swing mechanism is tough to master" in the end concluding "A fun, if challenging, game, and certainly different"

The game generated almost $300,000 in revenue.

References

1994 video games
Empire Interactive games
Golf video games